Govindapuram is a village in the Ariyalur taluk of Ariyalur district, Tamil Nadu, India.

Demographics 

 census, Govindapuram had a total population of 3,718 with 1,699 males and 2,019 females.

References 

Villages in Ariyalur district